Four referendums were held in San Marino on 15 May 2016. Three of the four proposals were approved, with the repeal of law 137 rejected.

Proposals
The four proposals put to voters were:
Changing the voting system so that voters cast a single vote for their preferred candidate; voters currently vote for a party or coalition list.
Repealing law 137 passed on 7 August 2015, which modified the 1992 law on economic development.
Abolishing the 25% quorum required for referendum proposals to be approved.
Capping public sector salaries at €100,000.

Results
In order for the proposals to be approved, a quorum of at least 25% of registered voters voting in favour had to be reached, together with a majority of valid votes in favour.

References

2016 referendums
2016 in San Marino
2016
May 2016 events in Europe